The 1889 New York Giants season was the franchise's seventh season. The team finished first in the National League with a record of 83–43. They beat the Boston Beaneaters by just one game. The Beaneaters won the same number of games as the Giants, but lost two more games, giving the pennant to the Giants. The Giants went on to face the American Association champion Brooklyn Bridegrooms in the 1889 World Series, winning six games to three. The series marked the first meeting between the Giants and the team that would become the Dodgers, a rivalry that continues to this day.

Regular season

Season standings

Record vs. opponents

Roster

Player stats

Batting

Starters by position 
Note: Pos = Position; G = Games played; AB = At bats; H = Hits; Avg. = Batting average; HR = Home runs; RBI = Runs batted in

Other batters 
Note: G = Games played; AB = At bats; H = Hits; Avg. = Batting average; HR = Home runs; RBI = Runs batted in

Pitching

Starting pitchers 
Note: G = Games pitched; IP = Innings pitched; W = Wins; L = Losses; ERA = Earned run average; SO = Strikeouts

Other pitchers 
Note: G = Games pitched; IP = Innings pitched; W = Wins; L = Losses; ERA = Earned run average; SO = Strikeouts

Relief pitchers 
Note: G = Games pitched; W = Wins; L = Losses; SV = Saves; ERA = Earned run average; SO = Strikeouts

1889 World Series 

The Giants beat the Brooklyn Bridegrooms six games to three in the World Series.

References 
1889 New York Giants season at Baseball Reference

New York Giants (NL)
San Francisco Giants seasons
National League champion seasons
World Series champion seasons
New York Giants season
New York Giants season
19th century in Manhattan
Washington Heights, Manhattan